Bing Crosby's Last Song is a novel by the American writer Lester Goran set in 1968 in the Oakland neighbourhood of Pittsburgh, Pennsylvania.

It tells the story of Daly Racklin, a Pittsburgh attorney who on a spring day learns from his doctor that he has one year to live. Racklin is a de facto voice of a dying Irish neighborhood, and he is also torn by his father's shadow and ambitions of his own.

Sources
Contemporary Authors Online. The Gale Group, 2008.

External links
Matthew Asprey Gear's 2010 essay "From Sobaski’s Stairway to the Irish Club: Lester Goran’s Pittsburgh"

1998 American novels
Novels set in Pittsburgh
Fiction set in 1968
Novels by Lester Goran
Novels set in the 1960s